Sajida is an Arabic given name for women. People named Sajida include:

 Sajida Sultan, Begum of Bhopal (1915–1995), Indian royalty 
 Sajida Alvi (born 1941), Canadian academic
 Sajida Begum, Pakistani politician
 Sajida Mubarak Atrous al-Rishawi (1970–2015), suicide bomber
 Sajida Talfah (born 1937), widow and cousin of former Iraqi President Saddam Hussein

See also
 Sajid (disambiguation)

Arabic feminine given names